Santiago Muñoz Gómez (born 8 June 1999) is a Colombian footballer who currently plays as a forward for Once Caldas.

Career statistics

Club

Notes

References

1999 births
Living people
Colombian footballers
Association football forwards
Leones F.C. footballers
Envigado F.C. players
Categoría Primera A players
Categoría Primera B players
Footballers from Bogotá